Holopleura is a genus of long-horned beetles in the family Cerambycidae. It is the only genus in the tribe 	Holopleurini. There is at least one described species in Holopleura, H. marginata.

References

Further reading

External links

Cerambycinae
Articles created by Qbugbot